Casuals F.C. were an amateur football club based in London, formed in 1883. They merged with Corinthian in 1939 to form the Corinthian-Casuals, a club which still exists.

History
The club was formed in 1883, and was originally made up of players exclusively of the old boys of Eton School, Westminster School and Charterhouse School but were quickly expanded to include players from all Universities and public schools. In the early days they would field up to five teams a week in order to meet all engagements.

For the duration of the 1890 FA Cup, the team merged with that of the Old Carthusians, who had won the trophy nine years previously.

They were founder members of the Isthmian League in 1905 though spent six seasons in the Southern Amateur League, 1907 to 1913, before returning to the Isthmain League for the 1913/14 season. Casuals won the FA Amateur Cup in 1936. In their early days playing the game they would tour the country like the Corinthians, and sometimes play more than one game in the same day, and at different venues, not at the same ground. They would also play more than once or twice a week, including playing everyday except Sunday.

In 1913, they defeated New Crusaders by 3 goals to 2 in the final of the AFA Senior Cup, after the Casuals scored a winning goal in the final minute.

In 1939, the club merged with Corinthian following a meeting on 4 January to form a new club Corinthian-Casuals at the end of the season. The merged club remains active and currently plays in Isthmian League Premier Division.

England internationals
Five Casuals players were capped for England.

The full list of England players (with the number of caps received whilst registered with Casuals F.C.) were:

Richard Raine Barker (1 cap)
Fred Ewer (2 caps)
Bernard Joy (1 cap)
Arthur Topham (1 cap)
Robert Topham (1 cap)

Honours
Winners
 London Charity Cup: 1891, 1894, 1897, 1901, 1904, 1905
 AFA Senior Cup: 1908, 1913
 Surrey Senior Cup: 1930
 FA Amateur Cup: 1936

Finalists
 London Senior Cup: 1889, 1893, 1895, 1896
 FA Amateur Cup: 1894
 AFA Senior Cup: 1909
 Isthmian League: 1937

References

External links

Official website of Corinthian Casuals F.C.

Corinthian-Casuals F.C.
Amateur association football teams
Association football clubs established in 1883
Association football clubs disestablished in 1939
Defunct football clubs in England
Defunct football clubs in London
Isthmian League
1883 establishments in England
1939 disestablishments in England